are a Japanese musical project formed in 2005 by Luna Sea members Ryuichi Kawamura (vocals) and Inoran (guitar), and D-Loop member Hiroaki "H. Hayama" Hayama (keyboards).

They reached the number three position on the Oricon Singles Weekly Ranking Chart with "Break the Chain", the opening theme of the TV tokusatsu series Kamen Rider Kiva. The group ended activities in 2008 shortly after its release.

Tourbillon reunited for a 10th anniversary concert at the Tokyo International Forum on November 27, 2015 and three performances at different Zepp venues throughout December. The compilation album The Decade - 10th Anniversary Best was released on November 25, 2015 and includes three new songs. One of these new songs, "Colorless Images", was released as a single on February 24, 2016 and used as the theme song of Kamen Rider: Battride War Genesis. A new album, Life is Beautiful, followed on October 12.

Discography

Albums
 Heaven (November 30, 2005), Oricon Albums Chart Peak Position: #13
 A Tide of New Era (November 8, 2006) #15
 The Decade - 10th Anniversary Best (November 25, 2015, compilation album) #39
 Life is Beautiful (October 12, 2016) #25

Singles
 "Heaven" (September 7, 2005), Oricon Singles Chart Peak Position: #12
 "Your Place" (October 5, 2005) #13
  #15
Theme song of the Black Jack anime film, .
  #21
 "Break the Chain" (March 26, 2008) #3
The theme song for the TV series Kamen Rider Kiva.
 "Colorless Images" (February 24, 2016) #61
The theme song for the video game Kamen Rider: Battride War Genesis.

DVDs
 Frame of Heaven (March 23, 2006), Oricon DVDs Chart Peak Position: #45
 10th Anniversary Tour 2015 in Zepp Tokyo (March 23, 2016) #132

References

External links
 Official site
 Luna Sea Official site
 D-Loop site

Avex Group artists
Japanese rock music groups
Japanese musical trios
Musical groups established in 2005
Musical groups reestablished in 2015